Mesomorph Enduros is a various artists compilation album released in December 1992 by Big Cat Records. It was assembled by musician and composer J. G. Thirlwell, who had been asked by Big Cat to compile songs by his favorite underground American bands. The songs "Room 429", "Johnny Shiv"  and "Blister" were recorded and made their debut specifically for the album's release. The album is dedicated to Unsane's former drummer Charlie Ondras, who had died in June.

Track listing

Personnel 
Adapted from the Mesomorph Enduros liner notes.
Stephen "The Pizz" Pizzurro – cover art
J. G. Thirlwell – compiling

Release history

References

External links 
 

1992 compilation albums
Albums produced by JG Thirlwell
Big Cat Records compilation albums
Alternative rock compilation albums
Industrial rock compilation albums
Noise rock compilation albums
Post-hardcore compilation albums